Abbas Hajkenari (born January 1, 1974, in Fereydoon Kenar) is an Iranian retired wrestler .

References
 Abbas Hajkenari at Sports Reference

External links
 

1974 births
Living people
Olympic wrestlers of Iran
Wrestlers at the 1996 Summer Olympics
Iranian male sport wrestlers
World Wrestling Championships medalists
20th-century Iranian people
21st-century Iranian people
World Wrestling Champions